Akenhaton Carlos Edwards CM (born 24 October 1978) is a Trinidadian former professional footballer who plays as a winger or right-back for  Bury Town.

He started his footballing career in Trinidad and Tobago before moving to Wrexham in 2000 for whom he made over 150 appearances. He went on to play for Luton Town, Sunderland, Wolverhampton Wanderers, Ipswich Town and Millwall. 

Edwards also made over 90 appearances for the Trinidad and Tobago national football team, scoring four goals. As a member of the squad that competed at the 2006 FIFA World Cup in Germany, he was awarded the Chaconia Medal (Gold Class), the second highest state decoration of Trinidad and Tobago.

Club career
Edwards, a right-winger also adept at right-back, started his professional career at Defence Force in his native Trinidad and Tobago, where he had attended the same school (St Anthony's College in Westmoorings) as future team-mate Kenwyne Jones.

Wrexham
Edwards was later signed by Wrexham for £250,000 in 2000, along with Dennis Lawrence and Hector Sam, after a trial.

Edwards helped the club win promotion to the Second Division in 2002–03, scoring 10 goals and winning Wrexham's Player of the Year award and being selected for the PFA Third Division Team of the Year along the way. He then added a further five goals the following season as the club finished mid-table, with Edwards again voted into the PFA Team of the Year.

However, Edwards suffered a knee injury while on international duty in 2004 that put him on the sidelines for most of the 2004–05 season. The campaign ended in relegation for the club but he won his first silverware in English football in the form of the 2005 Football League Trophy.

Luton Town
With his Wrexham contract having expired, Edwards joined Championship side Luton Town in 2005 in a three-year deal on a Bosman transfer. At Luton, he became popular with the fans with his flair and ability, winning the Young Members Player of the Season award in his first season with the club.

Sunderland
Edwards' form attracted a £1.5 million bid from Sunderland whom he joined on 2 January 2007, signing a three-and-a-half-year contract. Edwards began his Sunderland career brightly and scored five times in the remainder of the campaign.  It was his 80th-minute winner against Burnley that confirmed Sunderland's promotion to the Premier League, after Derby County failed to beat Crystal Palace the following day.

Edwards' first season in the top flight was ruined by injury problems though. He suffered a hamstring injury in only the second game and after returning, had a leg fracture that again put him on the sidelines. He managed to return for the final months of the campaign that saw Sunderland retain their Premier League status.

After a spree of summer signings left Edwards largely out of contention at his parent club, he joined Championship side Wolverhampton Wanderers on 2 October 2008 on a three-month loan. However, he was recalled early by the Black Cats on 20 November after six appearances for Wolves.

Ipswich Town
On 1 September 2009, Edwards and Grant Leadbitter signed for Ipswich Town for a combined fee of £4 million. He scored his first goal for Ipswich in a 1–0 win at Sheffield Wednesday on 20 February 2010. He quickly became a key player at Ipswich, making 30 appearances during his first season at the club.

He scored his first goal of the 2010–11 season on 21 August, scoring the winning goal in a 2–1 away win over Crystal Palace. Edwards played purely as a right winger under Roy Keane but switched to right-back when Paul Jewell became manager in January 2011. He scored the winning goal in a 3–2 win over Doncaster Rovers on 22 January. He only missed one league game during the 2010–11, while also playing a key role as Ipswich made the semi-final of the League Cup, starting in the 1–0 win over Arsenal in the first-leg at Portman Road, while also starting in the second-leg at the Emirates Stadium as Ipswich exited the cup after a 3–0 loss.

He continued to be a regular starter in the 2011–12 season. Edwards became Ipswich captain in March 2012. He started all but one league game during the season, with his performances earning him the Players' Player of the Year award for the 2011–12 season.

He kept his place as captain the following season, playing a key part in the first-team during the 2012–13 season as Ipswich recovered from a poor start to the season resulting in the sacking of manager Paul Jewell, to pick-up in the second half of the season following the arrival of new manager Mick McCarthy. He scored late winners in 1–0 wins over Bolton Wanderers and Derby County. He made 46 appearances in all competitions during the season.

Edwards featured less regularly during the 2013–14 season, scoring once in 18 appearances up until January.

Millwall
On 27 March 2014, Edwards joined fellow Championship side Millwall on loan until 3 May 2014. His first goal for Millwall on 8 April, netting the winning goal in a 1–0 away win over Wigan Athletic at the DW Stadium. He made 8 appearances during his loan spell at Millwall.

On 21 May 2014, Edwards joined Millwall permanently on a free transfer, signing a contract until June 2015. The veteran started the 2014–15 season in the first-team. On 22 September 2014, he suffered a serious knee injury during Millwall's 0–0 draw against Nottingham Forest ruling him out for the rest of the 2014–2015 campaign.

On 24 August 2015, Edwards re-joined Millwall on a short-term deal until January 2016, following his earlier release from the club. He made 22 appearances during the season, helping Millwall reach the 2016 Football League One play-off final, starting at right-back as Millwall lost out 1–3 to Barnsley.

Ma Pau
In October 2016, Edwards joined Ma Pau Stars.

Central FC
Edwards joined Central FC in May 2017 for the Caribbean Cup on a three-week contract.

Woodbridge Town
In December 2017 Edwards returned to Suffolk to play for non-League club Woodbridge Town. He was appointed joint manager of the club in April 2019. In January 2020 he signed dual registration terms with Bury Town, allowing him to play for Bury when Woodbridge were not playing.

Bury Town
In September 2020, it was announced Edwards had joined Isthmian League side Bury Town full time for the 2020–21 season after leaving his position at Woodbridge Town.

International career
Edwards made his international debut for the Trinidad and Tobago national team on 5 June 1999 against Grenada in the 1999 Caribbean Cup, despite never having appeared at any youth level for his country before.

After winning that tournament, Edwards went on to become an established international and was part of the team that reached the World Cup Finals for the first time in the country's history and was duly selected for the squad for the 2006 World Cup in Germany. He played every minute of their participation during the competition, against Sweden, England and Paraguay, respectively.

Personal life
Edwards was named after Eighteenth Dynasty Ancient Egyptian ruler, Akhenaten.

Career statistics

Club

International

Scores and results list Trinidad and Tobago's goal tally first, score column indicates score after each Edwards goal.

Honours
Wrexham
FAW Premier Cup: 2000–01, 2002–03, 2003–04
Football League Third Division promoted: 2002–03
Football League Trophy: 2004–05

Sunderland
Football League Championship: 2006–07

Trinidad and Tobago
Caribbean Cup: 1999, 2001

Individual
Wrexham Player of the Year: 2002–03
PFA Team of the Year: 2002–03 Third Division, 2003–04 Second Division, 2006–07 Championship
Ipswich Town Players' Player of the Year: 2011–12

Medals
 Chaconia Medal Gold Class: 2006

References

External links

Carlos Edwards Profile on the Soca Warriors Online website

1978 births
Living people
People from Diego Martin
Trinidad and Tobago Seventh-day Adventists
Association football midfielders
Trinidad and Tobago footballers
Trinidad and Tobago international footballers
Defence Force F.C. players
Wrexham A.F.C. players
Luton Town F.C. players
Sunderland A.F.C. players
Wolverhampton Wanderers F.C. players
Ipswich Town F.C. players
Millwall F.C. players
Central F.C. players
Woodbridge Town F.C. players
Bury Town F.C. players
Premier League players
English Football League players
2005 CONCACAF Gold Cup players
2006 FIFA World Cup players
2013 CONCACAF Gold Cup players
Recipients of the Chaconia Medal
TT Pro League players
Trinidad and Tobago expatriate footballers
Expatriate footballers in England
Trinidad and Tobago expatriate sportspeople in England
Expatriate footballers in Wales
Trinidad and Tobago expatriate sportspeople in Wales
Woodbridge Town F.C. managers
Trinidad and Tobago football managers